Royal Air Force Castle Kennedy or more simply RAF Castle Kennedy is a former Royal Air Force satellite station located in Castle Kennedy, Dumfries and Galloway, Scotland.

The following units were here at some point:
 No. 2 Squadron RAF
 No. 2 Torpedo Training Unit RAF (December 1942 - September 1943)
 No. 3 Air Gunners School RAF (April - December 1942 & November 1943 - June 1945
 No. 10 Air Gunners School RAF (July - December 1941)
 Detachment of No. 17 Service Flying Training School RAF (November - December 1944)
 No. 104 Storage Sub Unit of No. 57 Maintenance Unit RAF (July 1945 - September 1947)
 No. 2799 Squadron RAF Regiment
 Central Gunnery School RAF (June - December 1941)

References

Citations

Bibliography

Castle Kennedy